Medfield  may refer to:

Places in the United States
 Medfield, Massachusetts, a town
 Medfield (CDP), Massachusetts, census-designated place comprising the town center
 Medfield, Baltimore, Maryland, a neighborhood
 Medfield College, a fictional American college featured in the live action Disney movies The Absent-Minded Professor, Son of Flubber, The Computer Wore Tennis Shoes, Now You See Him, Now You Don't, and The Strongest Man in the World.

Other uses
 Medfield (system on chip), code name for an Intel Atom system on chip platform